The black-headed blenny (Microlipophrys nigriceps) is a species of combtooth blenny found in the Mediterranean Sea. It can reach a maximum length of  TL.  This species is also found in the aquarium trade.

References

black-headed blenny
Fish of the Adriatic Sea
Fish of the Mediterranean Sea
Taxa named by Decio Vinciguerra
black-headed blenny